Alberdi is a Spanish surname of Basque origin. Notable people with the surname include:

Cristina Alberdi (born 1946), Spanish politician and lawyer
Inés Alberdi (born 1948), Spanish sociologist, Executive Director of UNIFEM and younger sister of Cristina Alberdi
Juan Bautista Alberdi (1810–1884), Argentine political theorist and diplomat

Basque-language surnames